Acacia plicata  is a species of wattle which is endemic to an area between Perth and Geraldton in Western Australia.

Description
Its globular, yellow flowerheads appear from late winter until mid spring.

Following flowering a  distinctively pleated seed pod is formed.

Classification
The species was first formally described by the botanist Bruce Maslin in 1975 as part of the work Studies in the genus Acacia (Mimosaceae) - A Revision of Series Pulchellae published in the journal Nuytsia. The only known synonym is Racosperma plicatum as described by Leslie Pedley in 2003.

Distribution
The species is found around Dandaragan in the Mid West region of Western Australia where it grows mostly in loamy and clay soils, often overlying sandstone or siltstone and is common in drainage lines.
It is often found along watercourses in the understorey as a part of Eucalyptus wandoo and Eucalyptus loxophleba woodland communities.

Cultivation
Seeds need to scarified or treated with boiling water prior to planting. It is drought and frost tolerant.

See also
List of Acacia species

References

plicata
Fabales of Australia
Acacias of Western Australia
Plants described in 1975
Taxa named by Bruce Maslin